Dārta-Elizabete Emuliņa (born 5 June 1997) is a Latvian tennis player. She is a member of the Latvia Fed Cup team and has a win-loss record in the Fed Cup of 2–4.

References

External links
 
 

1997 births
Living people
Sportspeople from Riga
Latvian female tennis players